Gagyeong Terminal() is a bus terminal located in Gagyeong-dong, Heungdeok-gu, Cheongju-si, Chungcheongbuk-do, Republic of Korea. It consists of two terminals:
 Cheongju Bus Terminal (Interbus Terminal)
 Cheongju Express Terminal (Express bus Terminal)

Bus stations in South Korea